Md. Shamsul Alam is a Bangladesh Nationalist Party politician. He was elected a member of parliament from Sirajganj-4 in February 1996 Bangladeshi general election.

Career 
Alam is a lawyer and former general secretary of Ullahpara Upazila Bangladesh Nationalist Party. He was elected a member of parliament rom Sirajganj-4 in February 1996 Bangladeshi general election as an Independent candidate.

References 

Living people
People from Sirajganj District
20th-century Bangladeshi lawyers
Bangladesh Nationalist Party politicians
6th Jatiya Sangsad members
Year of birth missing (living people)